Navagraha Jain Temple or Navagraha Teertha or Navagraha Tirtha is situated at Varur near Hubli, Karnataka. Navagraha Teertha is one of the major pilgrim spots for the Jain community in India. The statue is the tallest statue of the Jain deity Parshvanatha in India and weighs 185 tons.

Monolithic statue
The construction of Navagraha Teertha began in January 2005 and the carving of the monolithic statues was completed in one year. The work was supervised by Sri Gunadhar Nandi Maharaj and supported by Sri Dharmasena Bhattaraka Swamiji and volunteers.

Navagraha Teertha, which is located at Varur, a village just  from Hubli-Dharwad city, has become an important place on the tourism map of the state, drawing huge crowds from all over the country. Navagraha Teertha, which is spread over 45 acres adjacent to the Pune-Bangalore Road, was set up by the Jain community with the help of people from other communities. It has been established largely through the efforts of Shri Gunadhar Nandi Maharaj.

It is believed that the Graha doshas of nine planets can be conciliated by worshipping following nine Tirthankaras: 

The monolithic statue of lord Parshwanth is not only very attractive but also larger than the statue of Gommateshwara statue in Shravanabelagola. Being in the city limit of Hubli Dharwad it is easy to reach there from any point of the city.

Accommodation
With the heavy inflow of tourists, a Yatri Nivas is being constructed here at a cost of Rs 5 crore. There are also plans to set up a musical fountain and garden on the lines of the one in Brindavan. Lodging and boarding facility is available for visitors free of cost here. About 50 rooms have been built to accommodate tourists, who are also served breakfast and lunch every day. Bus services are available to this place from Hubli Old Bus Terminus. Long-distance buses also stop at Navagraha Teertha on request. Auto-rickshaws are also available from the city and charge Rs 150-200 for a trip.

See also
Statue of Ahimsa
Gommateshvara statue
Bawangaja
List of the tallest statues in India

References

External links 
 

Hubli–Dharwad
Jain temples in Karnataka
21st-century Jain temples
Colossal Jain statues in India